The 1969 Asian Basketball Confederation Championship for Men was held in Bangkok, Thailand. Ten Asian teams participated in the competition but Laos played under special invitation and the games did not count in the championship standings.

Results

Final standing

Awards

References

 Results
 archive.fiba.com

Asia Championship, 1969
1969
B
B
ABC